The Benito Juárez Hemicycle is a Neoclassical monument located at the Alameda Central park in Mexico City, Mexico and commemorating the Mexican statesman Benito Juárez. The statue of Juárez is flanked by marble Doric columns. There are two allegorical female statues next to Juárez, representing the fatherland and law. The pedestal bears the inscription "Al benemerito Benito Juárez la Patria" (Spanish: "To the meritorious Benito Juárez, the Homeland"). It was depicted on the reverse of the 20 peso bill of Series C and D, issued in 1994.

History 
The construction began in 1906 it mark the centennial of Juárez's birth. The engineers for the construction of the monument were assigned by Porfirio Díaz. Statues were sculpted by the Italian artist Alessandro Lazzerini.

The monument was dedicated on September 18, 1910.

Style 
It is Neoclassical style, semicircular, with strong Greek influence; it has twelve Doric columns, supporting an entablature and frieze structure of the same order. 
On both sides it has two golden spikes.

At the center is a sculpture composed of Benito Juarez seated with two allegories: one representing the homeland crowning Juarez with laurels in the presence of a second that represents the law in the basement has festoons, another sculpture center that chairs a republican eagle with open wings in a facing, with neoaztec frets, which lie two lions.

On the central pillar there is a medallion surrounded by a laurel, inscribed with the following;

References

1910 establishments in Mexico
1910 sculptures
Alameda Central
Allegorical sculptures
Buildings and structures completed in 1910
Monuments and memorials in Mexico City
Neoclassical architecture in Mexico
Outdoor sculptures in Mexico City
Sculptures of men in Mexico
Sculptures of women in Mexico
Statues in Mexico City
Benito Juárez